Rosemont—La Petite-Patrie (formerly known as Rosemont and Rosemont—Petite-Patrie) is a federal electoral district in Quebec, Canada, that has been represented in the House of Commons of Canada since 1979.

Geography
The district includes the neighbourhood of Petite-Patrie and the part of Rosemont west of Pie-IX Boulevard. Its whole territory is part of the Montreal Borough of Rosemont–La Petite-Patrie.

Demographics
According to the Canada 2021 Census

 Languages: (2021) 74.2% French, 5.2% English, 4.5% Spanish, 2.5% Arabic, 1.3% Portuguese, 1.1% Italian

History
The riding was created under the name "Rosemont" in 1976 from parts of the ridings of Lafontaine, Maisonneuve—Rosemont, Papineau, and Saint-Michel. The name was changed to "Rosemont—Petite-Patrie" in 2000, and then to its current name in 2003.

This riding gained a small fraction of territory from Outremont during the 2012 electoral redistribution.

Members of Parliament

This riding has elected the following Members of Parliament:

Election results

Rosemont—La Petite-Patrie, 2003 - present

			
Note: Conservative vote is compared to the total of the Canadian Alliance vote and Progressive Conservative vote in 2000 election.

Rosemont—Petite-Patrie, 2000 - 2003

Rosemont, 1976 - 2000

See also
 List of Canadian federal electoral districts
 Past Canadian electoral districts

References

Campaign expense data from Elections Canada
Riding history from the Library of Parliament:
Rosemont
Rosemont—Petite-Patrie
Rosemont—La Petite-Patrie
2011 Results from Elections Canada

Notes

Federal electoral districts of Montreal
Rosemont–La Petite-Patrie
1976 establishments in Quebec